Arthur Poole was a footballer who played at right-half for Mossley and Port Vale. He featured in nine Football League games in the 1920–21 season.

Career
Poole joined Port Vale from Mossley in September 1920. He played nine Second Division games and one FA Cup game before being released from his contract at The Old Recreation Ground at the end of the 1920–21 season.

Career statistics
Source:

References

Year of birth missing
Year of death missing
English footballers
Association football midfielders
Mossley A.F.C. players
Port Vale F.C. players
English Football League players